Jakob Nikolayevich Popov (1802 (1798?) - after 1852 (1859?)) was a Russian architect. His most noted work is the Demidovsky Pillar.

1802 births
1859 deaths
19th-century architects from the Russian Empire